Christian Thomsen may refer to:
  (1940–), Danish film director and author  
 Christian Jürgensen Thomsen (1788–1865), Danish antiquarian
 Christian Thomsen (sculptor) (1860–1921), Danish sculptor
 Christian Lind Thomsen (born 1985), Danish badminton player

See also
 Christian Thompson (disambiguation)